The National Association of Independent Schools (NAIS) is a U.S.-based membership organization for private, nonprofit, K-12 schools. Founded in 1962, NAIS represents independent schools and associations in the United States, including day, boarding, and day/boarding schools; elementary and secondary schools; boys', girls', and coeducational schools.  NAIS has affiliate members internationally as well.

NAIS's mission is to be the national voice of independent schools and the center for collective action on their behalf.

Membership
As of the 2010–11 school year, NAIS represented approximately 1,400 member independent schools and associations in the United States, serving more than 562,000 students and 121,000 teachers, administrators, and other staff. Membership in NAIS is open to independent pre-college schools operated by nonprofit organizations. To become a full member of NAIS, a school must have operated for at least five years and must be accredited by an accrediting organization approved by NAIS.

Accreditation criteria 
Over the course of a 10-year cycle, associations prepare a self-study demonstrating compliance with the Criteria for Effective Independent School Accreditation Practices. The criteria provide common ground for member associations by delineating best practices, policies, and procedures. In addition, associations use the Model Core Standards—a set of "ideal" standards—in assessing their own standards.

As part of the process of "accrediting the accreditors," each member association:

 Hosts a visit from a team composed of commission members;
 Receives written recommendations from the commission; and
 Engages in follow-up activities to improve the state or regional accreditation process.

Accountability serves two purposes: ongoing association improvement and advancement.

Background

History

The NAIS was organized in 1962, the result of the merger of the Independent Schools Education Board and the National Council of Independent Schools.

In response to requests from several state, regional, and national accrediting organizations, the NAIS commission on accreditation was established by the NAIS Board of Trustees in 2001 and convened for the first time in 2002. The 19 member commission's work was intended to assure the quality of independent school accrediting programs. The commission's primary responsibility was to develop a public understanding of and credibility for state and regional accrediting programs.  In addition, the commission developed criteria for effective independent school accreditation practices, standards, and successful accreditation policy and procedure models and engaged in research to inform accreditation practice.  It was composed of members from state and regional accrediting associations that were members of NAIS, at-large members, and NAIS Board members.

The NAIS commission on accreditation disbanded in 2018. The successor organization, the International Council Advancing Independent School Accreditation (ICAISA), began formal operations in 2018 as an independent 501(c)(3) organization.

Organizational structure 
The NAIS board of trustees comprises eighteen members, led by the officers and the Executive Committee. Board members serve three-year terms. The board appoints the NAIS president, who oversees association business with the aid of a small staff.

. Over the course of a 10-year cycle, associations prepared a self-study demonstrating compliance with the Criteria for Effective Independent School Accreditation Practices. The criteria provided common ground for member associations by delineating best practices, policies, and procedures. In addition, associations used Model Core Standards – a set of “ideal” standards — in assessing their own standards. As part of "accrediting the accreditors", each member association hosts a visit from other accredited association members, receives written recommendations, and engages in follow-up activities to improve the state or regional accreditation process. As with school accreditation, this served two purposes: institutional improvement and quality assurance.

Accreditation commission 

The following are state, regional, and international accrediting organizations that were members of the NAIS commission on accreditation and became founding members of the International Council Advancing Independent School Accreditation (ICAISA):

State accrediting associations
 
Association of Colorado Independent Schools (ACIS)
California Association of Independent Schools (CAIS/CA)
Connecticut Association of Independent Schools (CAIS/CT)
Florida Council of Independent Schools (FCIS)
Hawaii Association of Independent Schools (HAIS)
New Jersey Association of Independent Schools (NJAIS)
New York State Association of Independent Schools (NYSAIS)
Pennsylvania Association of Independent Schools (PAIS)
Virginia Association of Independent Schools (VAIS)
Association of Independent Maryland and DC Schools

Regional, national and international accrediting associations
 
Canadian Accredited Independent Schools (CAIS/CAN)
Council of International Schools (CIS)
Association of Independent Schools in New England (AISNE)
Independent Schools Association of the Central States (ISACS)
Independent Schools Association of the Southwest (ISAS)
New England Association of Schools and Colleges (NEASC)
Northwest Association of Independent Schools (NWAIS)
Southern Association of Independent Schools (SAIS)
Southwest Association of Episcopal Schools (SAES)

See also 
Canadian Accredited Independent Schools, formerly Standards in Excellence And Learning (SEAL)
Education in the United States
Environment of the United States
Environmental groups and resources serving K–12 schools

References

External links
 National Association of Independent Schools

 
Private and independent school organizations in the United States
School accreditors
United States schools associations